PRO TV Chișinău is a private, generalist TV channel from Moldova. It was founded in 1999. It is operated by Prodigital SRL (initially - Mediapro SRL), part of CME trust. Besides some PRO TV Bucharest's programs, PRO TV Chișinău broadcasts local newscasts and shows, as well as local advertising.

PRO TV Chișinău is one of the first private stations in Moldova.

The company has been managed since it opened by Cătălin Giosan.

News
PRO TV Chișinău broadcasts four news bulletins a day, Monday to Friday, two bulletins on Saturday and one newscast on Sunday.

At urban level, PRO TV Chișinău is the second most viewed channel.

PRO TV Chișinău was the only TV to cover live the April 2009 Moldovan parliamentary election protests, for international television stations. APTN took the satellite signal by PRO TV as its broadcast was attacked with stones. PRO TV Chișinău supplied news stories and pictures for TV stations across the world, mainly in Russia, Ukraine, Italy, the United Kingdom and the United States. PRO TV Chișinău reported live for PRO TV in Bucharest from Russia (as in case of Moscow theater hostage crisis in 2002).

References

External links
 

Television channels in Moldova
Television channels and stations established in 1999
1999 establishments in Moldova
Mass media in Chișinău